The 2005 Metro Atlantic Athletic Conference baseball tournament took place from May 25 through 27, 2005. The top four regular season finishers of the league's teams met in the double-elimination tournament held at Dutchess Stadium in Wappingers Falls, New York.  won their first tournament championship and earned the conference's automatic bid to the 2005 NCAA Division I baseball tournament.

Seeding 
The top four teams were seeded one through four based on their conference winning percentage. They then played a double-elimination tournament.

Results

All-Tournament Team 
The following players were named to the All-Tournament Team.

Most Valuable Player 
Andy Kiriakedes was named Tournament Most Outstanding Player. Kiriakedes was a shortstop for Marist who batted .500 for the tournament.

References 

Tournament
Metro Atlantic Athletic Conference Baseball Tournament
Metro Atlantic Athletic Conference baseball tournament